Hidden headlamps, also commonly known as pop-up headlamps, pop-up headlights, flip-eye headlamps, or hideaway headlights, are a form of automotive lighting and an automotive styling feature that conceals an automobile's headlamps when they are not in use.

Depending on the design, the headlamps may be mounted in a housing that rotates so as to sit flush with the front end as on the Lamborghini Miura or Porsche 928, may retract into the hood and/or fenders as on the 1963–2004 Chevrolet Corvette, or may be concealed behind retractable or rotating grille panels as on the 1966-1970 Dodge Charger, 1970-1971 Mercury Cyclone, or the 1965 Buick Riviera.

History 

Hidden headlamps first appeared on the Cord 810 in November 1935 at the New York Auto Show and shortly after on a custom example of the Alfa Romeo 8C in 1936. In the Cord, a pair of cranks on either side of the dashboard could be turned by hand to bring out the headlamps when needed. Powered hidden headlamps first appeared on GM's concept car in 1938, the Buick Y-Job, and appeared on concept cars for several years after, including the 1951 General Motors Le Sabre. However, power hidden headlamps would not appear on a production vehicle until 1962 with the Lotus Elan.
The popularity of this feature has waxed and waned over time. Hidden headlamps regained popularity in the mid-to-late 1960s, first in Europe but particularly in the US where aerodynamic headlamps were not permitted. A relatively large variety of cars incorporated hidden headlamps in the 1970s, 1980s, 1990s, and up to the early 2000s. Subsequent legislation led to hidden headlamps falling increasingly out of favor.

In the past, manufacturers often used hidden headlamps to circumvent headlight height regulations in the United States. For instance, in 1983, Toyota exported their retractable headlight version of the AE86 (known domestically as the Sprinter Trueno) instead of the Corolla Levin, as the former had a higher headlamp height, enough to satisfy US regulations. This prevented them from needing to raise the body height of the car, which would have affected handling.

Discontinuation 
US laws now permit aerodynamic headlamps, relative to which hidden headlamps represent added cost, weight, and complexity as well as reliability concerns as cars age. Internationalized ECE auto safety regulations have also recently incorporated pedestrian-protection provisions restricting protuberances from car bodies, making it more difficult and expensive to design compliant pop-up headlamps.

The last time pop-up headlamps appeared on a volume-production car was in 2004, when both the Lotus Esprit and Chevrolet Corvette (C5) ended production. Development of both projector beam headlamps such as those on the 1990 Nissan 300ZX (Z32), and more efficient, bright LED headlamps has in practice, eliminated the need for hidden headlamps altogether.

Despite new cars no longer offering hidden headlamps since 2004, hidden headlamps are not outright banned, and as such, they can be still be installed on vehicles today such as the Ares Design Project1.

List of cars with hidden headlamps

Production cars

AC 3000ME, 1979–1984
Ares Design Project1, 2018 (redesign of the Lamborghini Huracán, also known as the Ares Panther; inspired by the De Tomaso Pantera)
Adams Brothers Probe 15, 1969
Adams Brothers Probe 16, 1969–1970
Adams Brothers Probe 2001, 1970–1972
Alfa Romeo 8C2900A Pininfarina Berlinetta, 1936
Alfa Romeo Montreal, 1970–1977
Alpine A610, 1991–1995
Alpine GTA, 1987 (U.S. spec)
Aston Martin Lagonda, 1976–1989
Aston Martin Vantage Zagato Volante, 1986–1989
Asüna Sunfire, 1993
Bitter CD & SC, 1973–1979
Bricklin SV-1, 1974–1976
BMW 8 Series (E31), 1989–1999
BMW M1, 1978–1981
Buick Reatta, 1988–1991
Buick Riviera, 1965–1969
Buick SkyHawk, 1986–1989
Burlington Centurion 1981-1982
Cadillac Eldorado, 1967–1968
Chevrolet Camaro, 1967–1969 (optional - usually with the Rally Sport model or the RS/SS package)
Chevrolet Caprice, 1968–1969 (optional and very rare)
Chevrolet Corvette, 1963–2004
Chevrolet Kingswood Estate, 1969 (optional and very rare)
Chrysler 300, 1968–1971
Chrysler Imperial, 1969–1993
Chrysler LeBaron, 1987–1992 (coupe & convertible only)
Chrysler New Yorker Fifth Avenue, 1990–1993
Chrysler New Yorker, 1976–1981 and 1988–1993
Cizeta-Moroder V16T, 1991–2003
Clan Clover 1984-1988
Continental Mark series, 1968–1983
Cord 810/812, 1936–1937
Covini B24, 1981
DARE DZ, 1998-1999
DeSoto, 1942
De Tomaso Mangusta, 1970–1971 (US-spec)
De Tomaso Pantera, 1971–1974
De Tomaso Guarà, 1993–2004
Dodge Charger, 1966–1970, (optional in 1971 & 1972)
Dodge Charger Daytona, 1969–1970
Dodge Daytona, 1987–1991
Dodge Magnum, 1978–1979 (clear covers)
Dodge Monaco, 1972–1973
Dodge Royal Monaco, 1976–1978
Dodge Stealth, 1991–1993
Dodge St. Regis, 1979–1981 (clear covers)
Eagle Talon, 1990–1991
Evante Sports 1600 Mk.2 1985-1994
Ferrari/Dino 208/308 GT4, 1974–1980
Ferrari 288 GTO, 1984–1985
Ferrari 308 GTB, 1975–1984
Ferrari 328, 1985–1989
Ferrari 348, 1989–1995
Ferrari 365 California Spyder, 1966–1967
Ferrari 365 GTB/4 & GTS/4 "Daytona", 365 GTC/4, 365 GT4 2+2, 1970–1976
Ferrari Daytona SP3, 2022
Ferrari 400/412, 1976–1989
Ferrari 456/456M, 1992–2003
Ferrari Berlinetta Boxer, 1973–1984
Ferrari F355, 1994–1999
Ferrari F40, 1987–1992
Ferrari Mondial, 1980–1995
Ferrari Testarossa, 512TR, 1984–1994
Fiat 125 Samantha, 1967 (a two-door coupé version of Fiat 125 built by Vignale and designed by Virginio Vairo)
Fiat/Bertone X1/9, 1972–1989
Ford/Mercury Capri, 1989–1994
Ford Galaxie 500 XL, 1968–1970
Ford LTD (Americas), 1968–1970; Landau, 1975–1978 (including Ford Country Squire wagon)
Ford LTD (Australia), 1973–1976
Ford Landau, 1973–1976
Ford Probe, 1989–1997
Ford Ranchero GT, 1970–1971
Ford Thunderbird, 1967–1969, 1977–1982
Ford Torino Brougham, Cobra, GT 1970–1971
Geo Storm, 1990–1991
Ginetta G4 Series IV (some models), 1981–1986
Ginetta G23/24, 1981
Ginetta G26/31, 1984–1986
Ginetta G27 (updated version of G4 Series IV), 1986-1990
Ginetta G32, 1989–1992
Ginetta G33, 1991
Grinnal TR8, 1990
Hawk HF3000, 1988
Hofstetter Turbo, 1986-1991
Honda Accord, 1986–1989
Honda Ballade, 1984–1987
Honda/Acura Integra/Rover 416, 1986–1989
Honda/Acura NSX, 1990–2001
Honda Prelude, 1983–1991
Honda Vigor, 1986–1989
Imperial, 1969–1975 and 1981–1983
“Irish” Clan 1982
Isdera Imperator 108i, 1991–1993 (facelift model)
Iso Lele, 1969–1974
Iso Grifo, 1965–1974
Isuzu Piazza, 1981–1987 (also Isuzu Impulse, Holden Piazza)
Jaguar XJ220, 1992–1994
Lamborghini Countach, 1974–1990
Lamborghini Diablo, 1990–1998
Lamborghini Islero, 1968–1969
Lamborghini Jalpa, 1981–1988
Lamborghini Jarama, 1970–1976
Lamborghini Urraco, 1973–1979
Lamborghini Miura, 1966–1973
Lamborghini Silhouette, 1976–1979
Lancia Montecarlo, 1975–1979 (for Scorpion, North American version)
Lancia Stratos, 1972–1973
, 1981-1987
Lincoln Continental, 1970–1979
Lister Storm, 1993–1999
Lombardi Grand Prix, 1968–1972
Lotus Eclat, 1974–1982
Lotus Elan, 1962–1973, 1967–1975 (+2 model), 1989-1995 (M100)(Also sold as Kia Elan)

Lotus Elite, 1974–1982
Lotus Esprit, 1976–2004
Lotus Excel, 1982–1992
Manta Mirage, 1974–1986
Maserati Bora, 1971–1980
Maserati Ghibli, 1966–1973
Maserati Indy, 1969–1974
Maserati Khamsin, 1974–1982
Maserati Merak, 1972–1982
Matra 530, 1967–1973
Matra Bagheera, 1973–1980
Matra Murena, 1980–1983
Mazda 626 (dealer optional with Mazda Cosmo HB front-end for Indonesian market), 1987
Mazda Cosmo/929 HB coupé, 1981–1989
Mazda Familia Astina, marketed in Europe as the original 323F, 1989–1994
Mazda MX-5/Miata NA, 1989–1997
Mazda RX-7, 1978–2002
Mercury Capri, 1991-1994
Mercury Cougar, 1967–1970
Mercury Cyclone  1970–1971
Mercury Marauder, 1969–1970
Mercury Marquis, 1969–1978
Mercury Montego MX, 1970–1971
Mitsubishi GTO/3000GT, 1991–1993
Mitsubishi Eclipse, 1990–1991
Mitsubishi Starion, 1982–1990 (also Dodge/Plymouth/Chrysler Conquest, captive imports)
Monica 560, 1973–1974
Monteverdi Hai 450  1970-1973
Nissan 180SX/200SX/240SX, 1989–1998
Nissan 300ZX Z31, 1984–1989
Nissan EXA, 1983–1990
Oldsmobile Toronado, 1966–1969 and 1986–1992
Opel GT, 1968–1973
Pangra, 1972–1973 (based on Ford Pinto)
Panther Solo, 1989–1990
Panther 6, 1976-1977
Plymouth Fury, 1970–1971 (Gran Coupe & Sport Fury, Sport Suburban wagon for 1971)
Plymouth Fury III, 1972 (optional), Gran Coupe & Sport Fury
Plymouth Laser, 1990–1991
Plymouth Superbird, 1970
Pontiac Fiero, 1984–1988
Pontiac Firebird (including the Trans Am and Formula), 1982–2002
Pontiac Grand Prix, 1967–1968
Pontiac GTO, 1968–1969
Pontiac Sunbird SE/GT 1986–1993
Pontiac Tojan 1985-1991
Porsche 911 Turbo SE 'Slantnose', 1985–1989, 964 Turbo S 'Flatnose', 1994
Porsche 914, 1969–1976
Porsche 924, 1976–1988
Porsche 928, 1978–1995
Porsche 944, 1982–1991
Porsche 968, 1991–1994
Quantum Sports Cars 2+2, 1993
Reliant Scimitar SS1/SST/Sabre, 1984–1995
Saab Sonett III, 1970–1974
Saturn SC2, 1991–1996
Subaru XT, 1985–1991
Siata 208 CS, 1952-1954 (also known as 200 CS)
Siva S160 Spyder, 1971-1973
Spectre R42, 1995-1998
Škoda 1100 GT, 1970
Škoda 110 Super Sport, 1971
Tatra MTX V8, 1991
Toyota 2000GT, 1967–1970
Toyota Celica, 1984–1993
Toyota MR2, 1984–1999
Toyota Sprinter Trueno/Corolla coupé, 1983–1991
Toyota Supra, 1982–1992
Toyota Tercel/Corolla II/Corsa SR/SV/SX/GP Turbo, 1986–1990
Triumph TR7/TR8, 1975–1982
TVR 350i, 350SX, 1983–1989
TVR 350SE, 1990–1991
TVR 390SE, 420SE, 1984–1989
TVR 400SE, 400SX, 430SE, 450SE, 1988–1991
TVR 420 SEAC, 1986–1988
TVR 450 SEAC, 1988–1989
TVR Tasmin, 280i, Tasmin 200, 1980–1988
Venturi 400 GT 1994–1997
Venturi Atlantique, 1987–1999
Venturi Coupé series/Transcup, 1987–1996
Volvo 480, 1986–1995
Vector M12, 1995–1999
Vector W8, 1989–1993
Yulon Arex, 1993–1995
Zimmer Quicksilver, 1986–1990

Concept cars

Alfa Romeo Caimano, 1971
Alfa Romeo Carabo, 1968
Alfa Romeo Delfino, 1983
Alfa Romeo Iguana, 1969
AMC AMX/3, 1970
Aston Martin Bulldog, 1980
Autozam AZ-550 Type A, 1989 
Avion 1984
BMW 830i/850i Cabrio/M8 (E31)
BMW GINA, 2008
Buick Y-Job, 1938
Chevrolet Aerovette, 1969-1976
Chevrolet CERVIII, 1990
Chevrolet Corvair Monza GT, 1962
Chevrolet Mako Shark, 1962
Covini B24
Dome Zero, 1976–1986
Ferrari 408 4RM, 1987-1988
Ferrari Rainbow, 1976
Ford Cobra 230 M.E., 1986
Ford Probe I, 1979
Ford Maya, 1984
General Motors Le Sabre, 1951
General Motors XP-819
Ginetta G25, 1983
Holden Hurricane, 1969
Jaguar XJ Spider Pininfarina, 1978
Karmann Cheetah, 1971
Lamborghini Athon, 1980
Lamborghini Bravo, 1974
Lamborghini Marco Polo, 1982
Lamborghini P140, 1987
Lancia Medusa, 1980
Lancia Mizar, 1974
Lancia Sibilo, 1978
Lincoln Quicksilver Ghia concept, 1983
Lotus Etna, 1984
Lotus M90, 1984
Mako Shark
Maserati Boomerang, 1972
MVS Ventury, 1984–1986
Mazda Miata M Coupe/Roadster, 1997
Mazda MX-5 (NA) Electric car, 1993
Mazda P729, 1986
Mazda V705, 1985 
Mazda MX-81 Aria, 1981
Mazda RX-7 Concept Model (FD), 1993 
Mercedes-Benz C111, 1969–1970
MG Boxer, 1978
MG EX-E, 1985
Nissan 126X, 1970
Nissan MID4, 1985–1987
Toyota FXV, 1985
Toyota SA-X, 1981
Toyota SV-2, 1981
Toyota SV-3, 1983
Tracer TXC, 1985
Vauxhall XVR, 1966
Vector WX-3, 1993
Volvo Tundra, 1979
Zender Vision 1S, 1983
Zender Vision 2, 1985
Zender Vision 3, 1987
Zender Vision 3C, 1986
Dacia MD87, 1988
Dacia MD87 Evo, 1990

Race cars

Rover-BRM

Other vehicles with hidden headlamps

Motorcycles
Honda Spacy 125 Striker, 1983–1986
Suzuki GSX750S (Katana), 1984–1985

Trains
Keisei Electric Railway AE100 (Skyliner), 1990–2016

Gallery

See also
Daytime running lamp

References

External links 
 

Auto parts
Automotive lamps
Automotive styling features